Sándor Németh (born 31 January 1957) is a Hungarian wrestler. He competed in the men's freestyle 57 kg at the 1980 Summer Olympics.

References

External links
 

1957 births
Living people
Hungarian male sport wrestlers
Olympic wrestlers of Hungary
Wrestlers at the 1980 Summer Olympics
Sportspeople from Vas County